The Senja Troll was a tourist attraction in Finnsæter on the island of Senja in northern Norway. It was completely destroyed in a fire on March 28, 2019. The largest troll statue in the world, it was the centerpiece of a family park associated with the Hulderheimen cultural center, together known as the Hulder and Troll Park. The troll has been given a wife, or crone (kjerring); inside both figures are an adventure park and other attractions.

History and facilities
The Hulderheimen cultural center in Finnsæter opened in 1989, named for a legend about a local mountain, the Hulderberg. The Senja Troll attraction opened nearby on June 1, 1993; it was built by Leif Rubach, who runs the attraction with his wife, Siw, dresses as a troll including fake troll feet, and calls himself the "troll father". He was inspired by a local legend of a troll who appeared both on the island and in the sea nearby. In 2007, after years of rivalry, the Hunderfossen Familiepark in Gudbrandsdalen conceded that their troll was not as tall.

Inside the troll was a two-story adventure park. Rubach was planning in 2017 to renovate this to add a section for fall and winter activities. There is also a miniature train, the "Sesam-train".

In 2007 a wife, or crone, was lowered beside the troll by crane; their union was blessed by a priest with two NRK program hosts serving jointly as best man, and in 2012 they had sextuplets, which were baptized.

On March 28, 2019, the Senja Troll caught fire and burned down within few minutes.

References

External links
 
  
 

Amusement parks in Norway
Amusement parks opened in 1993
Tourist attractions in Troms og Finnmark
Senja